List of fellows of the American Academy in Rome 1896 – 1970 records those American artists and scholars who have been awarded the Rome Prize from 1896 to 1970.

The Rome Prize is a prestigious American award made annually by the American Academy in Rome since 1896, through a national competition.  The categories for the prize have changed since the earliest years of the academy to the present.

Fellows of the American Academy in Rome

References

External links
 American Academy in Rome, official website of the Academy

American awards
Arts awards
Architecture awards
American music awards
History awards
Education in Rome
Culture in Rome
Awards established in 1896
Fellows of the American Academy in Rome 1896 - 1970
19th-century awards
20th-century awards
1896